Takes Place In Your Work Space is White Denim's fifth EP released in 2011.

Track listing
 Cat City
 No Real Reason
 Handwriting
 Company

Personnel
 James Petralli: vocals, guitar
 Joshua Block: drums
 Steve Terebecki: vocals, bass
 Austin Jenkins: guitar

2011 EPs
White Denim albums